You and You Alone is the eleventh studio album by American country music artist Randy Travis. His first album for DreamWorks Records Nashville, it produced four singles on the Billboard country music charts between 1998 and 1999: "Out of My Bones", "The Hole", "Spirit of a Boy, Wisdom of a Man", and "Stranger in My Mirror", which peaked at numbers 2, 9, 2 and 16, respectively, on the country charts. Counting his 1993 side project Wind in the Wire, this is also the second of three studio albums of his career not to be produced by longtime producer Kyle Lehning (Travis' succeeding album, 1999's A Man Ain't Made of Stone, was the third and final project that Lehning did not produce). Instead, Travis co-produced the album with Byron Gallimore and James Stroud.

"Spirit of a Boy, Wisdom of a Man" was originally recorded by Mark Collie on his 1995 album, Tennessee Plates. "Horse Called Music" is a Willie Nelson cover from his 1989 album, A Horse Called Music. "Satisfied Mind" is a Hal Ketchum cover from his 1996 greatest-hits album, The Hits.

"Only Worse" was best known for playing in the background of a diner in the 2000 comedy film Road Trip.

Patrick Swayze, a friend of Travis', sang background vocals on the track "I Did My Part".

Track listing

Personnel
Compiled from liner notes.

 Eddie Bayers – drums
 Larry Beiard – acoustic guitar
 Mike Brignardello – bass guitar
 Larry Byrom – acoustic guitar
 Stuart Duncan – fiddle
 Paul Franklin – steel guitar, Dobro
 Sonny Garrish – steel guitar, Dobro
 Vince Gill – background vocals
 Aubrey Haynie – fiddle, mandolin
 Jeff King – electric guitar
 Alison Krauss – background vocals
 Paul Leim – drums
 Terry McMillan – harmonica
 Brent Mason – acoustic guitar, electric guitar
 Melba Montgomery – background vocals
 Steve Nathan – keyboards, piano, Hammond B-3 organ
 Michael Rhodes – bass guitar
 Matt Rollings – piano, Hammond B-3 organ
 Brent Rowan – electric guitar
 John Wesley Ryles – background vocals
 Leslie Satcher – background vocals
 Patrick Swayze – background vocals on "I Did My Part"
 Randy Travis – lead vocals
 Dan Tyminski – background vocals, vibraphone
 Lonnie Wilson – drums
 Glenn Worf – bass guitar
 Curtis Wright – background vocals
 Curtis Young – background vocals

Chart performance

Weekly charts

Year-end charts

References

1998 albums
DreamWorks Records albums
Randy Travis albums
Albums produced by Byron Gallimore
Albums produced by James Stroud